may refer to:

 , a part of Japanese national highway Route 41, the section inside Nagoya.
 , or Line 1, of the Fukuoka City Subway
 
 
 
 Official nickname of JR Miyazaki Kūkō Line.
 Unofficial name of JR Narita Line Airport Branch Line.
 Unofficial name of Sendai Airport Line.
 Unofficial name of Hanshin Expressway Route 11.